Taichung Futuro FC is a professional football club based in Taichung, Taiwan which currently competes in the Taiwan Football Premier League.

History

Taichung Futuro Football Academy was founded in 2016 by Japanese footballer Yoshitaka Komori. The men's team was established in 2018.

Current squad

Managers

References

2016 establishments in Taiwan
Football clubs in Taiwan
Association football clubs established in 2016
Sport in Taichung